The 1965 Akron Zips football team represented Akron University in the 1965 NCAA College Division football season as a member of the Ohio Athletic Conference (OAC). Led by fifth-year head coach Gordon K. Larson, the Zips played their home games at the Rubber Bowl in Akron, Ohio. They finished the season with a record of 5–3–1 overall and 4–1 in conference play, tying for second place in the OAC. They outscored their opponents 110–94.

Schedule

References

Akron
Akron Zips football seasons
Akron Zips football